Peleg Whitman Chandler (April 12, 1816 – May 28, 1889) was an American lawyer, legal news reporter and editor, Boston's city attorney (solicitor), and a two-term state legislator in the Massachusetts General Court.

As City Solicitor, Chandler defended Boston's exclusion of African American students from its public schools in the legal case of Roberts v. City of Boston.

Life
Chandler's father and grandfather were also named Peleg Chandler; his mother was Esther Parsons Chandler.

Born in New Gloucester, Maine, he studied at Bangor Theological Seminary and received his degree from Bowdoin College in 1834. He studied law with his father, in the law office of Theophilus Parsons, and at  Harvard Law School. Chandler was admitted to the Massachusetts Bar Association in 1837, in which year he also married Martha Ann Bush, with whom he went on to have four children.

Chandler practiced law in Boston, contributed law reports to the Boston Daily Advertiser and also founded the Law Reporter journal, which was the first magazine on law to be successful in the US. He served on the Boston City Council from 1843 to 1845 and in the Massachusetts Governor's Council in 1850. He was also a member of the Massachusetts House of Representatives for 1844-1845 and 1862-1863.

In 1850, as City Solicitor, Chandler defended Boston's exclusion of African American students from its public schools in the legal case of Roberts v. City of Boston.

Chandler died at his Boston home from heart failure, after a long illness, on May 28, 1889.

Publications
Among Chandler's published writings are:

Legacy
In 1872, Chandler funded the refurbishment of Massachusetts Hall, Bowdoin College according to designs by A. C. Martin. The works included removal of a staircase, the creation of a first-floor recitation room and space to house the Cleaveland Cabinet of mineral and natural history specimens. Cleaveland was his father-in-law.

Chandler's papers are kept several institutions including the Phillips Library, Massachusetts Historical Society, the Hayes Presidential Center, and the Bowdoin College Library.

References

External links
Reviews of American Criminal Trials in:
 North American Review
The American Jurist
The Law Magazine and Review
The Christian Examiner and General Review
The Pioneer: A Literary and Critical Magazine (p. 46)

1816 births
1889 deaths
People from New Gloucester, Maine
Lawyers from Boston
Politicians from Boston
Journalists from Massachusetts
Bowdoin College alumni
Harvard Law School alumni
Boston City Council members
Members of the Massachusetts House of Representatives
Members of the Massachusetts Governor's Council
Writers from Boston
Writers from Maine
19th-century American politicians
19th-century American lawyers